is a Japanese football player. His last team was Rovers FC in Guam.

Club career
Known for his peregrinating football career, Itō has traveled and played as a foreign footballer in 19 countries or regions around the Asian Pacific area, including Japan, Australia, Singapore, Vietnam, Thailand, Malaysia, Brunei, Maldives, Hong Kong, Macau, India, Myanmar, Nepal, Cambodia, Philippines, Mongolia, Laos, Bhutan, and Sri Lanka.

Itō appeared for the Hong Kong League XI selection which participated at the 2004 Carlsberg Cup.

Club statistics

References

External links

 The Incredible Story of Dan Itō
 India Exclusive: Churchill Brothers sign Japan's Dan Itō
 Japanese midfielder Itō to play for Penang
 Itō causes a stir
 Dan Itō: Japanese player comes to training with LAO Toyota F.C.

1978 births
Living people
Sendai University alumni
Association football people from Hokkaido
Japanese footballers
J2 League players
Japan Football League (1992–1998) players
Vegalta Sendai players
Japanese expatriate footballers
Expatriate footballers in Singapore
Expatriate soccer players in Australia
Expatriate footballers in Vietnam
Japanese expatriate sportspeople in Hong Kong
Expatriate footballers in Hong Kong
Hong Kong First Division League players
Kitchee SC players
Windsor Arch Ka I players
Lao Toyota F.C. players
Colombo FC players
Yotha F.C. players
Expatriate footballers in Malaysia
Sabah F.C. (Malaysia) players
Penang F.C. players
Dan Itō
Expatriate footballers in Brunei
Expatriate footballers in the Maldives
Club Valencia players
DPMM FC players
Expatriate footballers in Macau
Expatriate footballers in India
Expatriate footballers in Myanmar
Expatriate footballers in Nepal
Manang Marshyangdi Club players
Expatriate footballers in Cambodia
Japanese expatriate sportspeople in Cambodia
Expatriate footballers in the Philippines
Green Archers United F.C. players
Expatriate footballers in Mongolia
Erchim players
Japanese expatriate sportspeople in Laos
Expatriate footballers in Laos
Japanese expatriate sportspeople in Bhutan
Expatriate footballers in Bhutan
Association football midfielders
Expatriate footballers in Sri Lanka
Expatriate footballers in Thailand
Sportspeople from Sapporo
Hong Kong League XI representative players
Sri Lanka Football Premier League players